Zabadak may refer to:

Zabadak! (song)
Zabadak (band), Japanese band